George Cadbury Jr (7 April 1878 – 27 September 1954) was a British chairman of Cadbury, business theorist, and philanthropist. He is best known for developing Cadbury Dairy Milk in 1905 which would become the company's best selling product.

Biography 
George Cadbury Jr was the second son of George Cadbury and his first wife, Mary (née Tylor). He grew up in the house which is now occupied by the Woodbrooke Quaker Study Centre near Birmingham, England. 

A Director and later Chairman of Cadburys Ltd, he was interested in the scientific and chemical aspects of the business, including standardising recipes and recording them in a book. After ten years of developing milk chocolate with his R&D team, in 1905 he launched Cadbury Dairy Milk. The bar was a great sales success, and became the company's best selling product by 1914.

See also 
Cadbury family

References

External links 

 George Cadbury Jr (1878-1954), Chairman of Cadbury Brothers Ltd, National Portrait Gallery, London

1878 births
1954 deaths
British business theorists
British businesspeople
British philanthropists
Cadbury